Emy or EMY may refer to:

People with the given name Emy
Emy Coligado (b. 1971), an American actress
Emy Gauffin (1928–1993), a Swedish orienteering competitor
Emy Jackson (b. 1945), a Japanese singer
Emy Kat (b. 1959), a visual artist
Emy Machnow (1897–1974), a Swedish freestyle swimmer
Emy Morse (1918–2018), Haitian singer, dancer and folklorist
Emy Pettersson (1908–1996), a Swedish sprinter
Emy Roeder (1890–1971), a German sculptor 
Emy Storey (b. 1981), an American graphic designer and illustrator 
Emy Storm (1925–2014), a Swedish actress

Other uses
Classic Maya language (ISO 639-3 code: emy) 
El Minya Airport, El Minya, Egypt (IATA code: EMY)
Emeryville station, California (station code: EMY)
Emy (TV series) a Sri Lankan television series
Exclusive Men of the Year Africa Awards, commonly known as the EMY Africa Awards, a Ghanaian awards show

See also
Emmy, an American television award
Emmy (given name) 
Emmy (disambiguation)